Christo Cave (born 19 December 1961) is a chess player from Tunapuna on the island of Trinidad, in Trinidad and Tobago. Cave is a former National Chess Champion and holds the record of thirteen wins in the Trinidad and Tobago Chess Championship.

He is a FIDE Master (FM) and has represented Trinidad and Tobago as the board 1 player at a number of World Chess Olympiads. In 2006, he became the first chess player from the English speaking Caribbean to defeat an International Grandmaster at a major team tournament.  He has also won several chess competitions locally.

After a short hiatus due to the illness of a family member, Cave returned to competitive chess in 2011.

References

External links
 
 
 
 
 
 Christo Cave at TheChessDrum.net

1961 births
Living people
Trinidad and Tobago chess players
People from Tunapuna–Piarco